Jessica Cameron is a Canadian horror film actress, director, screenwriter, and producer.

Early life
Cameron was born in Owen Sound, Ontario where she graduated high school before moving to Toronto to study fashion at Ryerson University.

Career
Cameron secured a job as a clothing designer in Ohio where she lived for a few years. After taking an acting class through her work, she was selected for a role in the movie The Dead Matter (2010) which was filmed in 2008. Cameron won the award for "Rising Movie Star" from the 2010 Golden Cobb Awards. Cameron co-starred in the Roger Corman produced SyFy Channel movie Camel Spiders (2011) and the remake Silent Night (2012) which starred veteran actor Malcolm McDowell. She acted in several independent productions in the Midwestern United States before making the move to Los Angeles to pursue acting full-time.

Cameron played herself on the TLC series Brides of Beverly Hills (2011-2012). She runs Small Town Girl Productions, a production company primarily producing genre films, and in 2013 directed her first film,  Truth or Dare.  Eight months later, she directed Mania, which was part of the documentary film series Kill The Production Assistant. Cameron has also appeared in comic books, music videos, and TV shows and was named "Scream queen of the Month" by ScreamQueen.com.  She was 2015 Guest of Manchester based Grimmfest, where her film Truth or Dare had its European premiere.

Filmography

Television and Web Series

References

External links 

 
 
 Bio at HorrorSociety.com
 TLC's Brides of Beverly Hills Bios: Jessica Cameron"
 Jessica Cameron on The Grave Plot Podcast

Living people
Actresses from Ontario
Film directors from Ontario
People from Owen Sound
Canadian film actresses
Year of birth missing (living people)
Canadian women film directors